The 1993–94 North West Counties Football League season was the 12th in the history of the North West Counties Football League, a football competition in England. Teams were divided into two divisions: Division One and Division Two.

Division One 

Division One featured two new teams:

 Rossendale United, relegated from the NPL Division One
 Bootle, promoted as runners-up of Division Two

League table

Division Two 

Division Two featured two new teams:

 Blackpool Mechanics, relegated from Division One
 Haslingden, joined from the West Lancashire Football League

League table

References

 RSSF NWCFL 1993–94 Accessed 13 April 2012

External links 
 NWCFL Official Site

North West Counties Football League seasons
8